Urlich is a surname. Notable people with the surname include:

Colleen Waata Urlich (1939–2015), New Zealand ceramicist
Margaret Urlich (1965–2022), New Zealand singer
Peter Urlich (born 1956), New Zealand musician
Ron Urlich (born 1944), New Zealand rugby union player

See also
Ulrich